"Dog of Death" is the nineteenth episode of the third season of the American animated television series The Simpsons. It originally aired on the Fox network in the United States on March 12, 1992. In the episode, Santa's Little Helper falls ill and the family must make budget cuts to pay for his operation. Although the dog's life is saved, the family begins to feel the strain of their sacrifices and starts treating him badly, causing him to run away. Santa's Little Helper ends up in the possession of Mr. Burns, who trains him to become a vicious attack dog. Several days later, Bart stumbles upon the trained Santa's Little Helper and is attacked, but the dog eventually recognizes his old friend and stops.

The episode was written by John Swartzwelder and directed by Jim Reardon. The writers enjoyed the previous episodes centered on Santa's Little Helper and decided to create another one, which resulted in "Dog of Death".

Since airing, the episode has received positive reviews from television critics. It acquired a Nielsen rating of 14.2 and was the highest-rated show on Fox the week it aired.

Plot
The Simpson family rushes Santa's Little Helper to the animal hospital, where they learn that he has a twisted stomach and needs a $750 operation. Homer tells Bart and Lisa that the family cannot afford the operation, but after seeing how much they love the dog, decides he will find a way to pay for it.

To save money for the operation, the Simpsons must make sacrifices: Homer stops buying beer and Bart gets his hair cut at a barber school. Marge must cook with lower-quality food and forgo her weekly lottery ticket. Lisa can no longer afford volumes of Encyclopedia Generica, and Maggie's tattered clothes must be repaired instead of replaced. The family saves enough money for the operation, which is a success.

The Simpsons are glad that their dog survives, but soon they start to feel the strain of their sacrifices. The family's morale suffers, and they direct their anger at Santa's Little Helper. Feeling unwanted, he runs away from home on an adventure, only to be captured, taken to the dog pound and adopted by Mr. Burns, who trains him to be one of his vicious attack hounds. After a brutal brainwashing process, Santa's Little Helper is turned into a bloodthirsty killer.

When Bart arrives at Mr. Burns' mansion, Santa's Little Helper starts to attack him. After recalling all the good times he had with Bart, Santa's Little Helper reverts to his friendly nature toward him. He protects Bart from Burns's pack of snarling hounds and returns to the Simpson family, who shower him with love as apologies for their foolishness.

Production

"Dog of Death" was written by long-time writer John Swartzwelder and directed by Jim Reardon. The producers decided to create another episode centered on Santa's Little Helper, as they enjoyed the previous ones, particularly season one's "Simpsons Roasting on an Open Fire", in which the Simpson family receives him. Reardon commented that one of the hardest feats with the episode was to make Santa's Little Helper not express any human expressions, as the staff preferred animals on the show to behave exactly the way they do in real life. The plot of "Dog of Death" was based on an experience Swartzwelder had with his own dog. The Gold Coast Bulletins Ryan Ellem commented that the Simpson family's dilemma with the cost of the veterinary procedure is a "very real" dilemma which many families "who normally don't budget for a pooch's bung knee" face.

Cultural references

"Dog of Death" features a number of references to popular culture and famous dogs. Santa's Little Helper's adventure resembles the plot of the 1963 film The Incredible Journey. The scene in which Mr. Burns brainwashes Santa's Little Helper with the Ludovico technique is a parody of Stanley Kubrick's film A Clockwork Orange, including the way Santa's Little Helper's eyes are held open while he is forced to watch a film featuring dog abuse, such as dogs being physically assaulted and getting their heads slammed by falling toilet lids. Ludwig van Beethoven's ninth symphony is heard during the sequence. In another scene, the dog Lassie is referenced when Santa's Little Helper rescues a child from a burning building. Homer claims that Santa's Little Helper will be going to Doggie Heaven, while Richard Nixon's dog Checkers and Adolf Hitler's dog Blondi will be going to Doggie Hell. The doctor who performs the surgery on Santa's Little Helper is based on Vince Edwards's titular character from the Ben Casey television series.

"Dog of Death" also parodies lottery advertisements. In one commercial featured in the episode, an announcement states: "The state lottery, where everybody wins," while a tiny disclaimer at the bottom of the screen can be seen saying: "Actual odds of winning, one in 380,000,000". During the peak of the lottery fever in Springfield, news anchor Kent Brockman announces on television that people hoping to get tips on how to win the jackpot have borrowed every available copy of Shirley Jackson's book The Lottery at the local library. One of them is Homer, who throws the book into the fireplace after Kent reveals that "Of course, the book does not contain any hints on how to win the lottery. It is, rather, a chilling tale of conformity gone mad." In her book Shirley Jackson: Essays on the Literary Legacy, Bernice Murphy comments that this scene displays some of the most contradictory things about Jackson: "It says a lot about the visibility of Jackson's most notorious tale that more than 50 years after its initial creation it is still famous enough to warrant a mention in the world's most famous sitcom. The fact that Springfield's citizenry also miss the point of Jackson's story completely [...] can perhaps be seen as an indication of a more general misrepresentation of Jackson and her work."

The episode contains several references to previous episodes of The Simpsons. For instance, Santa's Little Helper gets picked up by a car on a street called "Michael Jackson Expressway", a reference to the season-three premiere episode "Stark Raving Dad", in which Mayor Quimby had the expressway renamed in honor of an expected visit by Michael Jackson. In another scene, Ned Flanders is seen wearing his "Assassin" running shoes from the season-two episode "Bart's Dog Gets an "F". The flyer Homer replaces with the "lost pet" notice is Principal Skinner's "Have you seen my body?" flyer from "Bart the Murderer".
Lisa references Richard Nixon's dog Checkers. Also, among the books that end up in the Simpsons' fireplace are The Lottery by Shirley Jackson, Fahrenheit 451 by Ray Bradbury, Fatherhood by Bill Cosby, and a book entitled Canine Surgery. Fatherhood was heavily referenced in the episode "Saturdays of Thunder" earlier this season. The scene in which Mr. Burns and Smithers brainwash Santa's Little Helper is a parody of A Clockwork Orange with Beethoven's "Ode to Joy". The film uses footage of a kind that would aggravate a dog: a dog being hit with a rolled-up newspaper, a shoe kicking a water dish, a kitten playing with a ball of string, a tank running over a doghouse, a dog being hit on the head by a falling toilet seat, and finally "footage" of Lyndon Johnson holding his dog up in the air by the ears (which really happened). Music from Peter and the Wolf, a children's story composed by Sergei Prokofiev, is played over the wanderings of Santa's Little Helper through Springfield's outer domains. This episode also references several controversies about Michael Jackson; for example, Kent Brockman's butler tells Kent that his pet llama bit Ted Kennedy, and Mr. Burns is sleeping in an iron lung as part of his longevity treatment. This episode shows the first time someone other than Homer says "D'oh!"Lisa, when she is assigned to do a report on Nicolaus Copernicus and realizes she does not have any reference books. One of the places to where Santa's Little Helper voyages, Swartzwelder County, where he rescues a baby from a burning house, is a reference to the writer of this episode, John Swartzwelder.

Reception

"Dog of Death" first aired on Fox in the United States on March 12, 1992. The episode finished 19th in the ratings that week, and beat its main competitor, The Cosby Show (NBC), which finished 28th. "Dog of Death" acquired a Nielsen rating of 14.2, equivalent to about 13.1 million viewing households, which made The Simpsons the highest-rated show on Fox the week the episode aired.

Since airing, "Dog of Death" has received positive reviews from television critics. Tom Adair of The Scotsman considers it to be a classic episode of the show, and Mark Zlotnick of UGO's DVDFanatic named it one of his personal favorites from season three. The episode's reference to A Clockwork Orange was named the 10th-greatest film reference in the history of the show by Total Films Nathan Ditum. Nate Meyers of Digitally Obsessed rated "Dog of Death" a3 (of 5) and commented that people who like dogs will enjoy the episode, in part because of Mr. Burns' attack-dog training program, which Meyers called a "brilliant reference to A Clockwork Orange". He added that the episode is unlikely to satisfy devoted fans, and the relationship between the family and Santa's Little Helper will not "register" to casual viewers; "Still, there are enough laughs (especially in the animal hospital) to keep the audience entertained."

DVD Movie Guide's Colin Jacobson also praised the parody of A Clockwork Orange, describing it as "possibly the funniest Clockwork Orange parody I've ever seen". Jacobson added that the episode as a whole offers "a terrific program. [...] From the cracks about the lottery and public hysteria that open the program to the calamities that befall the family when Santa's Little Helper gets sick to the bizarre escapades that greet the pooch when he splits, 'Dog of Death' provides a hilarious piece."

The authors of the book I Can't Believe It's a Bigger and Better Updated Unofficial Simpsons Guide, Warren Martyn and Adrian Wood, praised several scenes from the episode, including Homer's dream of winning the lottery, Mr. Burns' brainwashing of Santa's Little Helper, and the closing line of the episode that "No dogs were harmed in the filming of this episode. A cat got sick, and someone shot a duck. But that's it."

Bill Gibron of DVD Verdict commented that Santa's Little Helper's "twisted stomach means the family must budget themselves to pay for the surgery, and the results are some of the best lines in the history of the show. From 'lousy chub night' to 'mmmm, snouts,' the hard knock life seems to enliven Homer into one sarcastic bastard." In 2007, Mikey Cahill of the Herald Sun named this episode's chalkboard gag, "I saw nothing unusual in the teacher's lounge", the third-best chalkboard gag in the show's history.

While reviewing the episode in 2011, Nathan Rabin of The A.V. Club noted, "perhaps because he's a fucking dog, Santa's Little Helper is never developed as fully as the other characters, so the requisite episode-ending orgy of sentimentality when Santa's Little Helper is joyously reunited with Bart feels a little cheap and unearned."

References

External links

The Simpsons (season 3) episodes
1992 American television episodes
Television shows written by John Swartzwelder
Television episodes about mammals